Wang Qiao may refer to:
 Wang Qiao (painter)
 Wang Qiao (engineer)